Ancylometis lavergnella is a species of moth in the  family Oecophoridae. It is endemic to Réunion.

See also
 Picture of Ancylometis lavergnella
 List of moths of Réunion

References

Moths described in 2011
Oecophoridae
Moths of Réunion
Endemic fauna of Réunion